Marudhar Express is a 2019 Indian romantic comedy film directed by Vishal Mishra. The film stars Kunaal Roy Kapur, Tara Alisha Berry and Rajesh Sharma. The film is set and shot in Kanpur, Uttar Pradesh.

The film has an eccentric proposition, it's a story about an arranged marriage couple who comes under the pressure of childbirth right after they are wedded. The film is loaded with humour, emotions and the reality of certain struggles faced after marriage.

The film was earlier titled as, Hum Dono Honge Kaamyaab. The film released in cinemas on 5 July 2019.

Synopsis 
Marudhar (Kunaal Roy Kapur) is the son of his tyrant father, Ashok Pandey (Rajesh Sharma). Straight as an arrow and boring as an oyster, Marudhar trudges along in his life, one hopeless day after the other. But Ashok has marriage plans for him and he won't have no for an answer. What follows is a comedy of ridiculous proportions as Marudhar marries the sweet and pretty Chitra (Tara Alisha Berry) from Lucknow. With no experience in dealing with women, let alone a wife, Marudhar embarks on an emotional and equally hilarious journey as he tries to find his feet amidst love, life and family.

Cast
 Kunaal Roy Kapur as Marudhar
 Tara Alisha Berry as Chitra
 Rajesh Sharma as Marudhar's father, Ashok Pandey

Soundtrack

The music was composed by Jeet Gannguli and Shamir Tandon with lyrics written by Manoj Muntashir, Rashmi Virag, Vishal Mishra and Sameer Anjaan.

References

2019 films
Indian romantic comedy films
Films set in Kanpur
Films shot in Kanpur
2019 romantic comedy films
Films scored by Jeet Ganguly
Films scored by Shamir Tandon